Miss Teen USA 2006, the 24th Miss Teen USA pageant, was televised live from Palm Springs Convention Center, Palm Springs, California on August 15, 2006.  The pageant was won by Katie Blair of Montana.

For the third time, the pageant was hosted by Palm Springs. It had previously been held there in 2003 and 2004. On August 10, the 51 contestants competed in a preliminary presentation show where they were judged in swimsuits and evening gowns. Scores from this judging will determine the top 15 on the live telecast on August 15, 2006.

At the conclusion of the final competition, Katie Blair of Montana was crowned by outgoing titleholder Allie LaForce of Ohio. This was the first year that Montana made the initial cut in the competition, and until this pageant Montana was the only state which had not placed. This is the first major pageant title won by a delegate from Montana.

All the delegates were first to required to win their state pageant, which in some states also meant holding a local title.

Results

Placements

Special awards

Delegates
The Miss Teen USA 2006 delegates were:

 Alabama - Carla Baumann
 Alaska - Degen Kasper
 Arizona - Emerald Zellers
 Arkansas - Taylor Wright
 California - Jessica Powell
 Colorado - Blair Griffith
 Connecticut - Kristen Heide
 Delaware - Erika Savidge
 District of Columbia - Jasmine Niernberger
 Florida - Jennifer Wooten
 Georgia - Brittany Sharp
 Hawaii - Hannah Thomas
 Idaho - Brianne Wickland
 Illinois - Ceitlyn Glenn
 Indiana - Halley Wallace
 Iowa - Danielle Malatek
 Kansas - Gentry Miller
 Kentucky - Tiffany Withrow
 Louisiana - Kelsey Lawson
 Maine - Donna Schlieper 
 Maryland - Jamie O'Brien
 Massachusetts - Caroline Caruso
 Michigan - Raquel McClendon
 Minnesota - Amy Blue
 Mississippi - Raegan Raulston
 Missouri - Breanna Huellinghorst
 Montana - Katie Blair
 Nebraska - Danielle Zuroski
 Nevada - Georgina Vaughan
 New Hampshire - Camille Westbrooks
 New Jersey - Julianna White
 New Mexico - Raquel Padilla
 New York -  Candace Kuykendall
 North Carolina - Melissa Lingafelt
 North Dakota - Katie Cooper
 Ohio - Peyton McCormick
 Oklahoma - Morgan Woolard
 Oregon - Kelci Rae Alberti-Flowers
 Pennsylvania - Inessa Rodriguez
 Rhode Island - Shaelyn McNally
 South Carolina -  Brittany Smith
 South Dakota - Alexandra Hoffman
 Tennessee - Ashley Durham
 Texas - Raevan Valadez
 Utah - Elizabeth Anne Leyda
 Vermont - Katharine Williams
 Virginia - Samantha Casey
 Washington - Kendra Lee Timm
 West Virginia - Lora Gallagher
 Wisconsin - Bishara Dorre
 Wyoming - Katy Lambert

Previous placements in state pageants
The following delegates had also competed in previous Miss Teen USA state pageants:
Taylor Wright (Arkansas) - 1st runner-up, Miss Arkansas Teen USA 2005
Blair Griffith (Colorado) - 2nd runner-up, Miss Colorado Teen USA 2005; 3rd runner-up, Miss Colorado Teen USA 2004
Danielle Malatek (Iowa) - 2nd runner-up, Miss Iowa Teen USA 2005
Kelsey Lawson (Louisiana) - 3rd runner-up, Miss Louisiana Teen USA 2005; 4th runner-up, Miss Louisiana Teen USA 2004
Donna Schlieper (Maine) - 1st runner-up, Miss Maine Teen USA 2005; 3rd runner-up, Miss Maine Teen USA 2004; Semi-finalist, Miss Maine Teen USA 2003
Jamie O'Brien (Maryland) - Semi-finalist, Miss Maryland Teen USA 2004
Raquel McClendon (Michigan) - Finalist, Miss Michigan Teen USA 2005
Amy Blue (Minnesota) - Semi-finalist, Miss Minnesota Teen USA 2004
Raegan Raulston (Mississippi) - 4th runner-up, Miss Mississippi Teen USA 2005
Breanna Huellinghorst (Missouri) - Semi-finalist, Miss Missouri Teen USA 2005
Julianna White (New Jersey) - Semi-finalist, Miss New Jersey Teen USA 2005
Shaelyn McNally (Rhode Island) - Semi-finalist, Miss Rhode Island Teen USA 2005
Raevan Valadez (Texas) - Contestant, Miss Austin Teen USA 2005 (prelim to Miss Texas Teen USA)
Samantha Casey (Virginia) - 1st runner-up, Miss Virginia Teen USA 2005; 1st runner-up, Miss Virginia Teen USA 2004 
Lora Gallagher (West Virginia) - 3rd runner-up, Miss West Virginia Teen USA 2005
Melissa Lingafelt (North Carolina) - 1 runner-up, Miss North Carolina Teen USA 2005

Crossovers
Bishara Dorre (Wisconsin) won Miss Wisconsin's Outstanding Teen 2007 and placed top 10 at Miss America's Outstanding Teen 2007. Later competed at Miss USA 2014 Finishing In The Top 10
Alexandra Hoffman (South Dakota) won Miss South Dakota 2008 and placed Top 15 at Miss America 2009.
Georgina Vaughn (Nevada) won Miss Nevada USA 2009 and competed at Miss USA 2009.
Samantha Casey (Virginia) won Miss Virginia USA 2010 and competed at Miss USA 2010 where she placed 2nd runner up.
Morgan Woolard (Oklahoma) won Miss Oklahoma USA 2010 and competed at Miss USA 2010 where she placed 1st runner up.
 Julianna White (New Jersey) became Miss New Jersey USA 2011 and competed at Miss USA 2011.
 Ashley Durham (Tennessee) won Miss Tennessee USA 2011 placed 1st runner up at Miss USA 2011.
 Blair Griffith (Colorado) won Miss Miss Colorado USA 2011 and competed at Miss USA 2011.
Katie Blair (Montana), the winner of Miss Teen USA 2006 and later inherited the title of Miss California USA 2011.
 Gentry Miller (Kansas) won Miss Kansas USA 2012 and will competed at the Miss USA 2012.
 Brittany Sharp (Georgia) won Miss Georgia USA 2013 and will compete at Miss USA 2013.
 Candace Kuykendall (New York) won Miss New York USA 2014 and will compete at Miss USA 2014.

Judges
Drake Bell
Darin Brooks
Brody Jenner
Hayden Panettiere
Susan M. Schultz
Chelsi Smith
David Vered

References and notes

External links
Official website

2006
2006 in the United States
2006 beauty pageants
2006 in California